Morse may refer to:

People
 Morse (surname)
 Morse Goodman (1917-1993), Anglican Bishop of Calgary, Canada
 Morse Robb (1902–1992), Canadian inventor and entrepreneur

Geography

Antarctica
 Cape Morse, Wilkes Land
 Mount Morse, Churchill Mountains
 Morse Nunataks
 Morse Spur, Victoria Land

Canada
 Rural Municipality of Morse No. 165, Saskatchewan
 Morse, Saskatchewan, a town
 Morse (provincial electoral district), Saskatchewan

China
 Morse Park, Hong Kong

New Zealand
 Morse River, New Zealand

South Georgia Island
 Morse Point, South Georgia Island

United States
 Morse, Illinois, an unincorporated community
 Morse, Iowa, an unincorporated community
 Morse, Louisiana, a village
 Morse River (Maine)
 Morse Township, Itasca County, Minnesota
 Morse Township, St. Louis County, Minnesota
 Morse, Texas, an unincorporated community and census-designated place
 Morse, Wisconsin, a town
 Morse (community), Wisconsin, an unincorporated community

Outer space
 Morse (crater), on the Moon
 8672 Morse, an asteroid

Arts and entertainment
 Inspector Morse, a fictional British detective in books by Colin Dexter and a television series
 Morse, French title for the Swedish horror film Let the Right One In
 Morse (album), by the New Zealand musician Alastair Galbraith, 1993

Businesses
 Morse Diving, an American maker of diving equipment
 Morse Dry Dock and Repair Company, a defunct American company
 C.C. Morse & Co., an American supplier of seeds and part of Ferry-Morse Seed Company
 Morse Theater, Chicago, Illinois, U.S., from 1912 until 1930

Other uses
 Morse College, a residential college at Yale University, Connecticut, U.S.
 Morse High School (disambiguation)
 USS Morse, a ferryboat used by the Union Navy in the American Civil War
 Morse station, a rapid transit station in Chicago, Illinois, U.S.
 Morse Auditorium, Boston University, Massachusetts, U.S.
 Morse House (disambiguation), various buildings
 Sea-lion, in heraldry sometimes called morse
 Morse, an archaic English word for the walrus
 Morse, an archaic word for walrus ivory
 Morse, a clasp of a cope
 Morse chain, a chain drive with inverted teeth

See also
 Morse code, a method of coding messages into long and short beeps, invented by Samuel Morse
 Morse potential, a model interatomic potential energy function
 Morse taper, a type of machine taper invented by Stephen A. Morse
 Morse theory, in mathematics
 Morse Farm (disambiguation)
 Morse Field (disambiguation)
 
Morsi

English-language masculine given names